is a horizontal scrolling shooter arcade game, which was released by Namco in 1988 only in Japan. It runs on Namco System 2 hardware, and was ported to the TurboGrafx-16 in 1989, with releases in both Japan and North America. It features a cameo from Pac-Man, as the "Stock bomber shot" - and the arcade version was also included in Namco Museum Volume 4 for the Sony PlayStation. The TurboGrafx-16 version was released on the Wii's Virtual Console on May 7, 2007 in North America and on August 21, 2007 in Japan; it is officially described by Namco as a "comical action shooter". The shopkeeper, Miyuki Chan, also appeared in a taco shop in Mach Breakers in 1994 and in a flying loudspeaker-shaped shop in Project X Zone 2 in 2015.

Gameplay

The players take control of the genius scientist  and his Chinese assistant  as they attempt to rescue Tomari's fiancée,  from the evil  and his army of robotic minions. The enemies all follow preset patterns, and killing a group of smaller ones or a larger one leaves crystals behind that can be collected and exchanged for special weapons, extra lives, and even more crystals at the "Kūchū IN" run by the blue-haired woman  and by firing out marbles at the extendable rotating target of the big white-handed robot . This game has a total of seven rounds, and a boss is fought at the end of each one. One hit will kill Yūichirō and Sunday, unless either of them has the "Stock bomber shot", as Pac-Man and the shield he is generating will protect them from death for one non-projectile hit. They can either earn or buy extra lives. This game also features voice samples (in Japanese).

Reception

In Japan, Game Machine listed Ordyne on their November 1, 1988 issue as being the second most-successful table arcade unit of the month.

Notes

References

External links

1988 video games
Arcade video games
Nintendo Switch games
PlayStation 4 games
TurboGrafx-16 games
Virtual Console games
Namco games
Namco arcade games
Horizontally scrolling shooters
Video games developed in Japan
Video games scored by Shinji Hosoe

Hamster Corporation games